Gomrok is a town located the south-west of the central district of Tehran in Iran.
Gomrok is also famous among Tehranians because of its pre-revolutionary (1979) history as a gateway to Tehran's red-light district so called Shahr-e No.

Neighbourhoods in Tehran